Shompangkha Gewog (Dzongkha: ཤོམ་སྤང་ཁ་) is a gewog (village block) of Sarpang District, Bhutan.

References

Gewogs of Bhutan
Sarpang District